Lieutenant General (Ret.) Lere Anan Timur is a Timorese general who has served as Commander of the F-FDTL since 6 October 2011 to 28 January 2022.

Background
He was born in an aristocratic family in Iliomar II at Lautem, and is the eldest of six siblings. He entered the military academy in 1965, and graduated in 1969. He also studied agriculture with the help of the Salesians of Don Bosco in 1969–1973, and served the Portuguese Army in 1974, before returning to East Timor in 1975.

He held various positions in the Falintil under the Fretilin, such as the political assistant for the Fretilin, and served during Indonesian invasion of East Timor. He served as commander of the Region 4 in 1984, became commander of the Centro Leste sector in 1987 and became commander of the Ponta Leste sector in 1993. He then serves as the Chief of Staff of the F-FDTL, and was promoted to Colonel by Taur Matan Ruak.

He became Deputy Commander of the Timor-Leste Defence Force in 2009, and was promoted to Brigadier General, until he was appointed as the Commander of the Timor Leste Defence Force on 6 October 2011. His term was extended for three times since 2015.

Awards in military service
  Order of Timor-Leste 
  Medal of Merit 
  Halibur Medal

Personal life
He is married to Cidália Mesquita Ximenes, his second wife, whom he married after his first wife, Elsa Pinto, died from childbirth in 1981. They have 8 children, including 2 from his first wife.

References

External links

 

1952 births
Living people
East Timorese military personnel
People from Lautém District